Several events occurred in radio in 2008.



Events 
February 11: The  Bosnian commercial Islamic radio station Radio BIR begins broadcasting from Sarajevo.
February 23: FM Hatsukaichi begins broadcasting in the Chūgoku region of Japan.
March 1: ADN Radio Chile, a sports and news service, begins broadcasting on 91.7 MHz FM from Santiago.
June 1: The eXpat Chart is launched on 4 English-language radio stations across Europe.
November 1: Big 106.2 is launched in Auckland, New Zealand.
date unknown: Iraqi public radio station Aredo FM begins broadcasting from Baghdad.

Debuts 
February 11: One on One with Igan, a Philippine weekday morning radio show, is launched, replacing Dobol A sa Dobol B. (See Endings.)
May 12: Super Balita sa Tanghali Nationwide, the midday newscast of DZBB in the Philippines, begins its run. 
December 13: Musikhjälpen, Swedish radio charity appeal

Endings 
January 30: Dobol A sa Dobol B, a Philippine weekday morning radio show, ends its first run, to be replaced by Morning Talk with Arnold Clavio.

Deaths 
January 16: Frank Shozo Baba, Japanese American radio broadcaster, 93
February 10: Inga Nielsen, Danish soprano and radio performer, 61 (cancer)
March 22: Cachao, Cuban musician and 1940s radio star with The Maravillas (La Radiofónica), 89
July 3: Harald Heide-Steen Jr., Norwegian actor, comedian, singer and radio presenter, 68
July 28: Wendo Kolosoy, Congolese musician, 83
August 5: Reg Lindsay, Australian country singer, songwriter, multi-instrumentalist, producer and radio and television personality, 79
August 16
Dorival Caymmi, Brazilian singer, songwriter, actor, painter and radio presenter, 94
Ronnie Drew, Irish folk musician and radio personality, 73 (16 September 1934 – 16 August 2008)
September 2: Arne Domnérus, Swedish jazz musician, featured soloist with the Swedish Radio Big Band, 83
September 18: Mauricio Kagel, German-Argentine composer and creator of "Hörspiel",76
September 24: Vice Vukov, Croatian singer and politician, Eurovision entrant, 72
September 26: Bernadette Greevy, Irish mezzo-soprano, winner of a 1978 Jacob's Award for her performance in a radio concert, 68

References 

 
Radio by year